Sydney Hamlets, an electoral district of the Legislative Assembly in the Australian state of New South Wales, had two incarnations, from 1950 until 1971 and from 1988 until 1999.


Election results

1858

October 1856 by-election

June 1856 by-election

1856

References

New South Wales state electoral results by district